The Mitchell Wing B-10 is an American high-wing, open cockpit, single-seat, tailless, ultralight aircraft and motor glider designed by Don Mitchell and based on his Mitchell Wing hang-glider. It has been produced by a variety of companies in the form of kits and plans for amateur construction. It first flew in 1980.

In 2012 the aircraft was still available in the form of plans and some materials, offered by US Pacific of Fresno, California.

Design and development
The Mitchell Wing started off as a foot-launched hang glider with good soaring performance. Mitchell later modified the design into a powered ultralight aircraft with  wheeled tricycle landing gear, known as the B-10. The B-10F is a foot-launched variant with only two wheels.

The B-10's fuselage is made from aluminum tubing while the wing has a birch plywood D-cell leading edge and foam ribs, covered with Dacron sailcloth or doped aircraft fabric. The tailless wing is common to all three variants. It is of tapered and lightly-swept form, employing a NACA 23015 airfoil. The  outboard wing panels have 6 degrees of dihedral and the wing overall has 12 degrees of sweep. The controls are conventional three axis, comprising trailing elevons and wing tip mounted vertical rudders, and operated via a top-mounted centre stick.

Power is provided by a single engine in pusher configuration, mounted behind the pilot's seat. Small engines in the  range can be used: The prototype was fitted with a  McCulloch MC101, with Chrysler West Bend and McCulloch two-strokes being recommended. and the Zenoah G-25 of  has been fitted.

Construction time for the supplied plans is estimated at 500 hours.

The B-10 can be quickly disassembled for ground transport or storage. The outer wing panels fold or can be removed, the fuselage cage is detachable and the tip rudders are quickly removed.

The B-10 was subsequently developed into the A-10 and two-seat T-10 and the mid-wing Mitchell U-2 Superwing.

Aircraft on display
US Southwest Soaring Museum

Specifications (B-10)

See also

References

External links

1980s United States sailplanes
Homebuilt aircraft
Don Mitchell aircraft
Tailless aircraft
Aircraft first flown in 1980
Motor gliders
Single-engined pusher aircraft